CSM Satu Mare is a Romania professional women's basketball club that is based in Satu Mare. The club competes in the Liga Națională.

Honours
 Liga Națională
Runners-up (4): 2010–11, 2011–12, 2017–18, 2018–19
 Romanian Cup
Runners-up (4): 2009–10, 2010–11, 2018–19, 2021–22

Current roster

References

External links
 Official website 
 eurobasket.com

Satu Mare
Basketball teams in Romania
Women's basketball teams in Romania
Basketball teams established in 2007
2007 establishments in Romania